is the 11th major single by the Japanese idol group AKB48, released on March 4, 2009.

It's a school graduation song.

The single peaked at number 3 in the Oricon Weekly Singles Chart.

10 years after the song was released, as well as the same day, the other center and now graduate, Atsuko Maeda, gave birth to her son. Some of the fans jokingly said that they had named Sakura/Zakura in commemoration of the anniversary.

Track listing 

Regular Edition 
CD

DVD

Bonus (First press limited edition only)
 Nationwide handshake meeting entry ticket (location of your choice)

Theater Edition 
CD
See Regular Edition CD
Bonus
 Handshake meeting ticket
 Random photo of a member (Teams A, K, B, Kenkyūsei, SKE48)

Members 
(Team affiliation at the time of the release. The members featured on the cover of the Theater Edition are in bold.)

Centers: Atsuko Maeda and Jurina Matsui

 Team A: Tomomi Itano, Mai Ōshima, Rie Kitahara, Haruna Kojima, Mariko Shinoda, Minami Takahashi, Reina Fujie, Atsuko Maeda, Minami Minegishi, Miho Miyazaki
 Team K: Yūko Ōshima, Erena Ono, Tomomi Kasai, Asuka Kuramochi, Sae Miyazawa, Sayaka Akimoto
 Team B: Yuki Kashiwagi, Rino Sashihara, Mayu Watanabe
 SKE48: Jurina Matsui, Rena Matsui

Charts

Sales and certifications

References

External links 
 AKB48 - 10nen Sakura (Music Video) (AKB48 official YouTube channel)
 AKB48 - 10nen Sakura (Music Video Making-of) (AKB48 official YouTube channel)

Songs about school
Songs about cherry blossom
2009 singles
Songs with lyrics by Yasushi Akimoto
AKB48 songs
King Records (Japan) singles
2009 songs
MNL48 songs